The Belgium women's cricket team toured Austria in September 2021 to play a three-match bilateral Women's Twenty20 International (WT20I) series. The matches were played at the Seebarn Cricket Ground in Lower Austria, and were the first official WT20I matches played by Belgium. Austria won the series 3–0.

Squads

WT20I series

1st WT20I

2nd WT20I

3rd WT20I

References

External links
 Series home at ESPN Cricinfo

Associate international cricket competitions in 2021